The following are the winners of the 11th annual (1984) Origins Award, presented at Origins 1985:

Charles Roberts Awards

The H.G. Wells Awards

External links
 1984 Origins Awards Winners

1984 awards
1984 awards in the United States
Origins Award winners